Crambus diarhabdellus is a moth in the family Crambidae. It was described by George Hampson in 1919. It is found in Ethiopia, Madagascar, Malawi and Sudan.

References

Crambini
Moths described in 1919
Moths of Africa